Chiloglottis formicifera, commonly known as the common ant orchid, is a species of orchid endemic to New South Wales. It has two broad leaves and a single narrow, greenish or reddish flower with a black, ant-like callus covering most of the upper surface of the labellum. There is a single record of this species from New Zealand.

Description
Flowering occurs from August to November.

Taxonomy and naming
Chiloglottis formicifera was first formally described in 1877 by Robert D. FitzGerald and the description was published in his book Australian Orchids from a specimen collected "in a gully at the Kurrajong". The specific epithet (formicifera) is derived from the Latin word formica meaning "ant" with the suffix -fera meaning "bear", "carry" or "have".

Distribution and habitat
The common ant orchid grows in moist places in forest between the Northern Tablelands and Nowra. There is a single historical record from Kaitaia in New Zealand.

References

External links 

formicifera
Orchids of New South Wales
Plants described in 1877